The 2020 Copa Constitució was the 28th edition of the Andorran national football knockout tournament. The opening round of this edition of the cup was played on 19 January 2020 and the final was held on 29 July 2020.

Engordany were the defending champions after winning the final over FC Santa Coloma by a score of 2–0.

On 1 July, 2020, plans were finalized for the Copa Constitució to resume on 26 July 2020 after a long delay due to the COVID-19 pandemic in Andorra.

Schedule

First round
Eight clubs competed in the first round. The matches were played on 19 January 2020.

|}

Quarter–finals
Eight clubs competed in the quarter–finals. The matches were played from 25 January to 12 February 2020.

|}

Semi–finals
The four quarter–final winners competed in the semi–finals. The matches were played on 26 July 2020.

|}

Final
The final was played on 29 July 2020.

See also
2019–20 Primera Divisió
2019–20 Segona Divisió

External links
UEFA

References

Andorra
Cup
2020